In organic chemistry, the Nef reaction is an organic reaction describing the acid hydrolysis of a salt of a primary or secondary nitroalkane to an aldehyde or a ketone and nitrous oxide. The reaction has been the subject of several literature reviews.

The reaction was reported in 1894 by the chemist John Ulric Nef, who treated the sodium salt of nitroethane with sulfuric acid resulting in an 85–89% yield of nitrous oxide and at least 70% yield of acetaldehyde. However, the reaction was pioneered a year earlier in 1893 by Konovalov, who converted the potassium salt of 1-phenylnitroethane with sulfuric acid to acetophenone.

Reaction mechanism
The reaction mechanism starting from the nitronate salt as the resonance structures 1a and 1b is depicted below:

The salt is protonated forming the nitronic acid 2 (in some cases these nitronates have been isolated) and once more to the iminium ion 3. This intermediate is attacked by water in a nucleophilic addition forming 4 which loses a proton and then water to the 1-nitroso-alkanol 5 which is believed to be responsible for the deep-blue color of the reaction mixture in many Nef reactions. This intermediate rearranges to hyponitrous acid 6 (forming nitrous oxide 6c through 6b) and the oxonium ion 7 which loses a proton to form the carbonyl compound.

Note that formation of the nitronate salt from the nitro compound requires an alpha hydrogen atom and therefore the reaction fails with tertiary nitro compounds.

Scope
The Nef reaction is frequently encountered in organic synthesis. It has been applied in carbohydrate chemistry as a chain-extension method for aldoses for example in the isotope labeling of C14-D-mannose and C14-D-glucose from D-arabinose and C14-nitromethane (the first step here is a Henry reaction):

The opposite reaction is the Wohl degradation.

The reaction is also used in combination with the Michael reaction in the synthesis of γ-keto-carbonyls such as:

or 2,5-heptanedione

Hydrolysis of nitro compounds with strong acid without the intermediate salt stage results in the formation of carboxylic acids and hydroxylamine salts.

The hydrolysis step of the Nef reaction can also be performed with Lewis acids such as tin(IV) chloride and iron(III) chloride or oxidizing agents, such as oxone.

References
 

Substitution reactions
Name reactions